Bathyclarias worthingtoni is a species of airbreathing catfish endemic to Lake Malawi, in the countries of Malawi, Mozambique and Tanzania.  This species grows to a length of 80 cm SL (31.5 inches).  This species is commercially caught for human consumption.

References
 

Bathyclarias
Fish of Africa
Fish described in 1959
Taxonomy articles created by Polbot